The Palawano languages are spoken in the province of Palawan in the Philippines, by the Palawano people.

Classification
There are three Palawano languages: the Quezon Palawano which is also known as Central Palawano; Brooke's Point Palawano and its dialect the Bugsuk Palawano or South Palawano and Southwest Palawano. The three Palawano languages share the island with several other Palawanic languages which are not part of the Palawano cluster, though they share a fair amount of vocabulary.

Phonology
The following overview is based on Revel-MacDonald (1979).

Consonants

Vowels

Grammar

Verb conjugations are similar to other Filipino dialects with prefixes and suffixes indicating tense, object or actor focus, as well as intention (i.e. commands).  These prefixes and suffixes can be used to create various parts of speech from the same root word. For example, biyag, meaning 'life', can be manipulated to mean 'to live' (megbiyag), 'full of food' (mebiyag), 'to raise to life' (ipebiyag), 'living' as an adjective (biyagen), or 'living' as a present tense verb form (pebibiyag).

Palawano creates a diminutive prefix by copying the first CV of the base together with the final base consonant: kusiŋ ('cat'): kuŋ-kusiŋ ('kitten'), bajuʔ ('clothing'): bäʔ-bajuʔ ('child's clothing'), libun ('woman'): lin-libun ('girl'), kunit ('yellow'): kut-kunit ('yellow flycatcher' (bird)), siak ('tears'): sik-siak ('crocodile tears/false tears').

Pronouns
The following set of pronouns are the pronouns found in the Southwest Palawano language. Note: the direct/nominative case is divided between full and short forms.

Vocabulary
There are many linguistic variations among Palawan family groups with words changing from one valley to the next (i.e. tabon for 'mountain' versus bukid). Tagalog is frequently used to supply words lacking in the local dialect for modern objects and actions which can cause confusion, especially among the younger generation, between Tagalog and Palawan.  The more familiar a family or village is with the Tagalog lowland culture, the more common the language overlap. The Palawano language has also historically incorporated a great number of Malay words. There is also some Cebuano influence similar to what is exhibited in the other parts of Palawan.

Some Brooke's Point Palawan words are:
 or  – friend
 – uncle (also a term of respect for an older man)
 – aunt (also a term of respect for an older woman) 
 – mother
 – father
 – get
 – sack
 – midday
 – purchase/buy
 – go
 or  – mountain
 – eat
 – good
 – love (noun)

Phrases:
 – friendly way of asking "Where are you going friend?", as a form of greeting.
 – means 'There, to the mountain, I will get a sack.'
 – this is usually referring to the dog, as a way to say "don't bite"
 – Where are you going?
. – Up the hill
. – Good morning

Comparative wordlist
The following compares the Palawano languages with other Greater Central Philippine languages.

Writing system

Latin alphabet
The spelling is controversial with multiple translators using separate spelling methods, some using Tagalog-based spelling while others use other systems.  

Brooke's Point Palawano uses 23 letters: a, b, [k], d, e, g, h, i, j, k, l, m, n, ng, o, p, r, s, t, u, w, y, and ' (glottal stop). Borrowed: c, f, q, x, z. The 'e' stands for schwa and "dy" makes a 'j' sound.

Ibalnan script

In the 20th century, the Tagbanwa script was adopted from the Tagbanwa people by the Palawan people further south in the island. They call this alphabet Ibalnan and the vowel mark an ulit.

References

External links
Zorc, R. David. 1972. Palawano notes.
Brooke's Point Palawano audio sample 
Brooke's Point Palawano dictionary

Palawanic languages
Languages of Palawan